Krebs House may refer to:

 De La Pointe-Krebs House, Pascagoula, Mississippi, also known as Old Spanish Fort, a Mississippi Landmark
 Knights of Columbus Hall (Pascagoula, Mississippi), also known as Krebs House, a Mississippi Landmark
Agnes V. Krebs House, Pascagoula, Mississippi, NRHP-listed in Jackson County, Mississippi
James Krebs House, Pascagoula, Mississippi, NRHP-listed in Jackson County, Mississippi